Yom HaZikaron, in full Yom HaZikaron LeHalelei Ma'arkhot Yisrael ul'Nifge'ei Pe'ulot HaEivah, is Israel's official remembrance day, enacted into law in 1963. While Yom HaZikaron has been traditionally dedicated to fallen soldiers, commemoration has also been extended to civilian victims of terrorism.

History

In 1949 and 1950, the first two years after the declaration of the State, memorial services for soldiers who fell in the 1947–1949 Palestine war were held on Independence Day. Services at military cemeteries were coordinated between the IDF and the Ministry of Defense. A concern arose, expressed by families of fallen soldiers, to establish a separate memorial day observance distinct from the festive celebrations of national independence. In response, and in light of public debate on the issue, Prime Minister David Ben-Gurion – also serving as Minister of Defense – established in January 1951 the "Public Council for Soldiers' Commemoration". This council recommended establishing the 4th of Iyyar, the day preceding Independence Day, as the "General Memorial Day for the Heroes of the War of Independence". This proposal won government approval that same year.

Observance
Yom HaZikaron is the national remembrance day observed in Israel for all Israeli military personnel who lost their lives in the struggle that led to the establishment of the State of Israel and for those who have been killed subsequently while on active duty in Israel's armed forces. As of Yom HaZikaron 2022, that number was 24,068.

Preceding evening
The day opens with a siren the preceding evening at 20:00 (8:00 pm), given that in the Hebrew calendar system, a day begins at sunset. The siren is heard all over the country and lasts for one minute, during which Israelis stop everything, including driving on highways, and stand in silence, commemorating the fallen and showing respect.

By law, all places of entertainment are closed on the eve of Yom HaZikaron, and broadcasting and educational bodies note the solemnity of the day. Regular television programs cease for the day, and the names and ranks of every soldier who died for Israel are displayed in a 24-hour television broadcast.

Since the founding of the state, Israel has chosen the Red Everlasting flower (Hebrew: דם המכבים, "Blood of the Maccabees") as the national memorial flower. The flower is depicted in many memorial sites and can be seen worn as stickers on shirts and jackets throughout Yom HaZikaron. Since 2019, the non-profit organization Dam HaMaccabim has been distributing pins with the real Red Everlasting flower throughout Israel and the United States.

Main memorial day
A two-minute siren is sounded at 11:00 the following morning, which marks the opening of the official memorial ceremonies and private remembrance gatherings at each cemetery where soldiers are buried.

Many Israelis visit the resting places of loved ones throughout the day.

National memorial services are held in the presence of Israel's top leadership and military personnel.

Memorial candles are lit in homes, army camps, schools, synagogues, and public places, and flags are lowered to half staff. Throughout the day, serving and retired military personnel serve as honor guards at war memorials throughout the country, and the families of the fallen participate in memorial ceremonies at military cemeteries.

Many traditional and religious Jews say prayers for the souls of the fallen soldiers on Yom HaZikaron. Special prayers prescribed by the Israeli rabbinate are recited. These include the recital of Psalm 9: "For the leader, on the death of the son," and Psalm 144: "Blessed be the Lord, My Rock, who traineth my hands for war and my fingers for battle" in addition to memorial prayers for the dead. The official ceremony to mark the opening of the day takes place at the Western Wall.

Israeli TV channels screen the names of all civilians killed in pogroms since 1851, and all fallen from 1860 (considered the date of the beginning of the Yishuv by the Israeli Ministry of Defense), in chronological order (rank, name, Hebrew date deceased and secular date) over the course of the day. Originally, this was done by the Israeli Broadcasting Authority's Channel 33; once the IBA was dissolved and replaced by the Israeli Public Broadcasting Corporation, the screening itself was moved to KAN 11 in lieu of Makan 33.
The day officially draws to a close at sundown (between 19:00 and 20:00; 7–8 p.m.) in a ceremony at the national military cemetery on Mount Herzl, marking the start of Israel Independence Day, when the flag of Israel is returned to full staff.

Scheduling Yom HaZikaron right before Independence Day is intended to remind people of the price paid for independence and of what was achieved with the soldiers' sacrifice. This transition shows the importance of this day among Israelis, most of whom have served in the armed forces, or have a connection with people who were killed during their military service.

Timing
To avoid the possibility of Sabbath desecration should either Yom HaZikaron or Independence Day take place on Saturday night, both are observed one or two days earlier (the 3rd and 4th, or the 2nd and 3rd, of Iyar) when the 5th of Iyar falls on a Friday or Saturday (Shabbat). Likewise, when Yom HaZikaron falls on Saturday night/Sunday day, both observances are rescheduled to one day later. This means that Yom HaZikaron is only actually observed on the 4th of Iyar if that date is a Tuesday. One time this occurred was in 2020.

See also 
 Culture of Israel
 Israeli casualties of war
 Martyrdom in Judaism

References

External links 

 Remembrance Day–Independence Day – Selected Readings

  
Iyar observances
Public holidays in Israel
Remembrance days
Armed Forces days
Annual events in Israel
Observances honoring victims of war